WMIO (102.3 FM) is a radio station broadcasting a Rhythmic Top 40 format. Licensed to Cabo Rojo, Puerto Rico, it serves the Puerto Rico area.  The station is currently owned by Uno Radio Group and repeats the audio of WCMN-FM.

History 
On December 15, 1988, WMIO begins operations on 102.3 FM, branded as MusiRadio. the station was founded by Maria Isabel Ortiz Avilés, which is the sister of radio entrepreneur, David Ortiz. The station was broadcast Beautiful Music and Adult Standards. in the 1990s, WMIO was a repeater for WFID, and later with WIAC-FM, until was sold to Bestov Broadcasting on April 14, 1999.

In March 2007, Uno Radio Group officially acquired WMIO from Bestov Broadcasting (previously known as Audioactiva 102.3 FM) and chained it with WCMN-FM "Toca De To' 107.3 FM".

On January 9, 2009, MSG Radio Inc. acquired WIAC-FM and through a contract with Uno Radio Group the Toca De To' brand was moved to 102.5 FM on January 16, 2009. Old Toca De To stations WCMN-FM 107.3 and WMIO 102.3 continue as "107.3 Mi Emisora" and did not simulcast WIAC-FM.

In August 2011 and after 102.5 FM change its name to Hot 102, 107.3 FM and 102.3 FM adopted again the brand "Toca De To" but this time as a slogan. By 2012, WMIO and WCMN became a simulcast of WTOK's Top 40 format.

External links
Hot102pr.com
1073miemisora.com (former website) 

MIO
Cabo Rojo, Puerto Rico
Rhythmic contemporary radio stations in the United States
1988 establishments in Puerto Rico
Radio stations established in 1988